U.S. Route 19 (US 19) runs  along Florida's west coast from an interchange with U.S. Route 41 in Memphis, Florida, south of Tampa, and continues to the Georgia border north of Monticello, Florida.

As is the case with all Florida roads with federal designations, the entirety of US 19 has a hidden Florida Department of Transportation designation:
 State Road 55 from the US route's southern terminus at US 41 south of Terra Ceia to the junction with US 221 / SR 55 north in Perry.
 State Road 30 from the junction with US 221 / SR 55 in Perry for roughly one mile to the junction with US 27 south (SR 20 east) / US 98 west (SR 30 west) via US 221 Truck.
 State Road 20 from the junction with US 27/US 98 in Perry cosigning with US 27 until the routes split in Capps.
 State Road 57 from the US 27/SR 20 split in Capps to the Georgia state line north of Texas Hill.

US 19 remains independent of I-75, even as the routes converge in the Tampa Bay Area. The route is co-signed with Interstate 275 over the Sunshine Skyway Bridge, a cable-stayed bridge over the mouth of Tampa Bay, US 98 between Chassahowitzka and Perry,  Alternate US 27 between Chiefland and Perry, and US 27 between and Perry and Capps.

Route description

Manatee County to Pinellas County

The road begins at an interchange with U.S. Route 41 in Manatee County, and remains independent until the interchange with Interstate 275 at Exit 5, where it overlaps I-275 across the Sunshine Skyway Bridge, the terminus of which is at Interstate 275 & State Road 682 at Exit 17.

According to a Dateline NBC study, part of US 19 in Florida is the most dangerous road in the United States. A Florida Highway Patrol test period beginning in 1998 and ending in 2003, as mandated by the National Highway Traffic Safety Administration, showed the stretch of US 19 from Pasco County to Pinellas County to average approximately 52 deaths a year, or 262 deaths in the 5-year duration of the study. 100 of these deaths were pedestrian related making US 19 the #1 worst road to walk on in these two counties. Multiple efforts to improve US 19 have been suggested to the FDOT.

Within Downtown St. Petersburg, US 19 crosses Alternate US 19, which used to serve as the southern terminus of Alt US 19 until 2006. US 19 runs along 34th Street until just south of the interchange at State Road 694 at Gandy and Park Boulevards in Pinellas Park. This interchange was intended for the formerly proposed Gandy Freeway. In eastern Largo, State Road 688 shares an interchange with the northern terminus of State Road 693, a road that leads to St. Pete Beach and was once part of State Road A19A. Immediately after this, the next interchange is at State Road 686, the road to the St. Petersburg-Clearwater Airport. State Road 60 is the site of the world's first Single-point urban interchange. Drew Street is north of the interchange, and for years has been a source of major accidents. By 2006, the freeway gap was filled between SR 60 and Sunset Point Road, however the service roads terminate at a creek between Drew Street and NE Coachman Road, creating a traffic situation similar to that of the Oakdale Merge on Long Island, New York.

As of 2017, US 19 is built to freeway standards from just south of 49th Street N to just north of State Road 580. The freeway has service roads along the length of the route and Texas U-turns at major interchanges.

Pasco County

When Alternate US 19 terminates at US 19 in Holiday across from a major trailer park, a de facto extension of the road serves as a brief multiplex with US 19 in Holiday which terminates a block north of the northern terminus of Alternate US 19 in Holiday at Mile Stretch Road (CR 595). After the intersection with Moog Road, US 19 takes a slight curve to the northeast before intersecting with State Road 54. Shortly after this, the road crosses CR 518 (Trouble Creek Road), then dips as it approaches the gateway to Gulf Harbors and curves straight north before reaching Gulf Boulevard. Downtown New Port Richey can be found roughly two miles north of this point at Main Street which is the northern terminus of unmarked southern CR 595, although the terminus used to be at Grand Boulevard in Port Richey. The bridge over the Pithlachascotee River, which carries US 19 from New Port Richey to Port Richey was a two-lane drawbridge until 1965. An even older version of that bridge is now fishing pier owned by a boat rental dealership.

Just as in Pinellas County, US 19 in Pasco County has been rated the most dangerous road in the United States. Ridge Road (CR 524) is considered to be one of the most dangerous intersection of US 19. However instead of making any genuine effort to improve the intersection by building an interchange, local governments have allowed developers to add a Wal-Mart and smaller stores in the vicinity of the intersection. The closest thing to an interchange that has been considered is an overpass strictly for left-turn lanes.

North of Ridge Road, US 19 passes by the Gulf View Square Mall as well as the Embassy Plaza and Embassy Crossing shopping centers on the opposite side of the mall. North of these two shopping centers, a marginal dirt road can be found on the east side of US 19 as far north as Fox Hollow Drive, while on the west side a paved road that may have been part of the old US 19 runs from the north end of the mall to Clemens Boulevard. After this, the road intersects CR 77 (Regency Park Drive) south of Jasmine Estates, Florida, which is only noticed because an 18 screen movie theater is located opposite from the terminus, before turning straight north again near the intersection with Hammock Road and Ranch Road. The next major intersection is State Road 52 in Bayonet Point. The southwest corner of SR 52 is dominated by a flea market which was originally a race track.

After curving from north to northeast near the Old Dixie Highway in Hudson Beach, US 19 intersects with Hudson Avenue and Fivay Drive, the latter of which was formerly part of County Road 1. The northern terminus of Little Road (CR 1) was built at the turn of the century further north. Between the former and current terminus of CR 1, US 19 is dotted with independent motels, one of which was plagued with so much flooding during the early 21st Century that it was torn down. Another marginal dirt road exists along the east side of this section. North of Little Road, US 19 curves straight north again.

Aripeka Road (CR 595) is located in one of the most rural sections of the county. Despite efforts to preserve some of the land in this section, a new gated community geared towards horse owners has sprung up north of Aripeka Road. US 19's journey through Pasco County ends at County Road 578 (County Line Road), and Holiday Springs RV Resort across from the west end of CR 578.

Hernando County

After the intersection at County Road 578 (County Line Road), US 19 continues northbound as a six-lane highway with occasional frontage roads. Tourist Development Council signs at both borders boast of the county being part of Florida's Nature Coast. The southern half of US 19 serves as most of the western border of Spring Hill, Florida. Applegate Road near Wendy Drive is only a short distance from CR 574 (Spring Hill Drive) and CR 595 (Osowaw Boulevard) serve as the Gateways to Spring Hill and Hernando Beach, although southbound US 19 travelers can reach CR 595 from Tarpon Boulevard. Osowaw and Tarpon Boulevards were once part of the Old Dixie Highway, which crossed over US 19 and back until shopping centers and a portion of Timber Pines, Florida were built along the road.

Evidence of post-war, pre-Disney efforts to attract tourists can be found in two dinosaur-shaped landmarks. The first is north of the Windward Village gated community, and the second is built around a local garage and former Sinclair gas station. In between there is another short former section of Old Dixie Highway north of Windward Village. Forest Oaks Boulevard is a street that runs past a local Hernando County Sheriff's station as it winds its way to Deltona Boulevard (CR 589). Berkley Manor Boulevard is the next intersection, but strictly leads to another Deed Restricted Community in Spring Hill. On the opposite side of these two intersections is a shopping center in front of two other roads leading to gated communities.

US 19 leaves Spring Hill north of Northcliffe Boulevard, and enters Weeki Wachee, Florida, "the City of Live Mermaids." Weeki Wachee Springs State Park, famous for the daily Mermaid performances and Buccaneer Bay water park is at the intersection of State Road 50 (Cortez Blvd). This coastal spur becomes County Road 550 (Hernando County, Florida) will travel out to Bayport (Bayport Park and boat ramp) and to Pine Island, the county's only Gulf water beach. A shopping center can be found diagonally across from the park. North of State Road 50 US 19 is four-lanes wide, and has had a limited number of median openings that contain left-turn lanes until 2014. Signs warn motorists that the region is a Bear Habitat. This is because much of what surrounds Route 19 north of Hexam Road consists of the Chassahowitzka National Wildlife Refuge. Even the intersection with CR 476 (Centralia Road) is barely notable without signs.

Citrus County
Across the Hernando-Citrus County Line, US 19 continues its rural surroundings, but this time has a limited number of left-turn lanes in the center-median. Recent development in the area may lead to the addition of such turn lanes. US 98 joins US 19 in Chassahowitzka, where State Road 700 ends. County Road 480 also shares this intersection, and overlaps US 98 before branching out on its own towards Floral City. The first developed neighborhood encountered along US 19-98 is Sugarmill Woods. After the western terminus of Cardinal Lane, the road passes by Howard's Flea Market then curves to the northwest. Within Homosassa Springs, the division temporarily ends after it overlaps County Road 490. CR 490A terminates at the three-route concurrency with US 19-98-CR 490. Less than 1/2 mile north of end of the CR 490 concurrency, the road becomes divided again. North of Homosassa Springs US 19-98 serves as the location of a series of car dealerships, local garages, a Moose Lodge, churches and the intersection of Ozello Trail (CR 494).

As the road approaches Crystal River Airport, it enters the City of Crystal River, since the Airport serves as the unofficial southern border. At the intersection of County Road 44W, US 19-98 becomes a six-lane divided boulevard. The division of this highway ends again, just south of the intersection of State Road 44, where the road curves west as it approaches County Road 495 (North Citrus Avenue). US 19-98 curves back north and becomes a divided highway once again as it approaches Crystal River Mall. It also passes by the Seven Rivers Regional Medical Center just south of the Crystal River Nuclear Power Plant and then County Road 488 in Red Level. A field where American Civil War re-enactments are staged lies just north of the back entrance to a local quarry.

The Cross Florida Barge Canal was the last section of US 19 that is two lanes wide in Citrus County. A new four-lane divided bridge was completed by FDOT in the early-2010s, which was originally planned in conjunction with the proposed Suncoast Parkway extension to Red Level. A smaller four-lane bridge carries US 19-98 across the Withlacoochee River as it crosses the Citrus-Levy County Line.

Levy County to Dixie County

US 19-98 crosses the Withlacoochee River and immediately enters Levy County and the city of Inglis, where it intersects with County Road 40. West of US 19-98, CR 40 is named "Follow That Dream Boulevard" for the 1962 movie starring Elvis Presley. Shortly after this, the road intersects CR 40A. North of Inglis, US 19-98 runs along sparse residences, trailer parks, a Florida Sheriff's Youth Facility, the Gulf Hammock Wildlife Management Area and eventually Goethe State Forest. Within the forest, the road crosses the Ten Mile Creek bridge before reaching an at-grade interchange with State Road 121 & County Road 336 in Lebanon Junction. From there, US 19-98 runs along an abandoned railroad line along the east side, while the median is widened and lined with the trees that existed before the road was ever built. This section also secretly overlaps CR 336. At the intersection of County Road 326 in Gulf Hammock, an old locomotive and caboose are on display. Blinking signals exist over the intersection with State Road 24 in Otter Creek, but the overlap with CR 336 leaves just before the signal.

Alternate US 27 joins US 19-98 in Chiefland where State Road 500 ends. This intersection was transformed into a 90-degree intersection, which directly faces a local high school. Almost instantly US 19-98-Alt 27 encounters the intersection of US 129.

US 19-ALT 27-98 makes a sharp left turn near the intersection of State Road 26 in Fanning Springs, where it also crosses the Joe H. Anderson Sr. Bridge over the Suwannee River, thus entering Dixie County. It then follows the left bank of the Suwannee River and intersects the eastern terminus of County Road 55A, and even contains a Truck Weight station in the median before reaching State Road 349 in Old Town, which used to be U.S. Route 129 Alternate. The road starts making more of a northwest turn after this and shortly afterward encounters CR 351 in Cross City, then passes through Shamrock where the road crosses County Road 358 twice. After the second crossing of CR 358, it begins to take an even more northerly direction before leaving Dixie County at the Steinhatchee River.

Taylor County to Jefferson County

Immediately after crossing the Steinhatchee River, US 19 enters Taylor County, where it intersects with State Road 51 at Tennille. The rest of the way, US 19 passes through small unincorporated areas such as Salem, Carbur, Athena, and Pinland.

In Bucell Junction US 19 gains the name Byron Butler Parkway as it intersects with State Road 30 and State Road 30A near the Perry-Foley Airport. SR 30 secretly joins US 19 momentarily. Within the city limits of Perry, SR 55 veers to the right along US 221. SR 30 is the secret designation north of here. Alternate US 27 terminates at US 27, which replaces it as an overlapping US route as US 98 heads west along State Road 30. From this point, the secret designation is State Road 20. It also briefly carries U.S. Truck Route 221 until it reaches County Road 359A (Wright Road).

In Eridu the road intersects with County Road 14. US 19/US 27 briefly enters Madison County where the name is changed to the Florida-Georgia Parkway, where it intersects with County Road 150, then Jefferson County. The first major town in Jefferson County that the road enters is Lamont, Florida, where US 19/US 27 encounters SR 165 and CRs 257A & 257B, as it begins to move in a more westerly direction.

Capps to the Georgia State Line

US 27 leaves US 19 in Capps along with SR 20, on its way through Tallahassee. From this point on, State Road 57 is the secret designation, and the road maintains the name Florida-Georgia Parkway. After the intersection with CR 158B, US 19 encounters Interstate 10 at Exit 225 in Drifton, then an intersection with County Road 57A, and later County Road 158. The road shares a concurrency with CR 259 as it intersects US 90 (SR 10) and CR 146, but it ends just south of the intersection with CR 149 in Monticello. US 19 finally crosses the Georgia state line where SR 57 ends and Georgia SR 3 and 300 begin, the former of which is the state route for US 19 into Atlanta, while the latter of which is the state route for US 19 from there to Albany, Georgia.

History

US 19 first entered Florida in 1929. It underwent three route shifts, the first in 1933, the second in 1946, and the third in 1951 which adjusted it to its current alignment, and created the alternate route in Pinellas County. US 19 was extended to its southern terminus of Memphis in September 1954, when the original Sunshine Skyway Bridge opened to traffic.

From 1956 until 1993, US 19 signs in Florida featured white numbering on a red shield. The "color-coding" of U.S. Routes by the Florida Department of Transportation was stopped when the state could no longer use Federal funds to replace the signs with anything but the standard black-and-white version; a few red US 19 signs remain.

Major intersections

References

External links

 US 19 in Florida @ SouthEastRoads.com

 Florida
19
19
19
19
19
19
19
19
19
19
19
19
Expressways in the Tampa Bay area
1929 establishments in Florida